Phillip William Morris (born 10 September 1975 in Newport, Wales) is a retired British motorcycle speedway rider. He was the former Team GB Under 21 team manager. He was also the team manager of the Birmingham Brummies for two seasons.

Speedway career

Early years
Phil Morris was the Welsh Schoolboy grasstrack champion at the age of nine and within two years was also the British Youth Grasstrack Champion, a title he won a total of five times.  He was signed by the Reading Racers a few days before his 16th Birthday.

Reading Racers
Plunged straight into first team action at the end of the 1991 season, the Welsh teenager was then named in the Racers starting line up for the 1992 season, and was part of the team that won the British League title that season. Morris became a key part of the Reading side over the next five seasons and although the club didn't repeat the success of the 1992 season, the Welshman was firmly established in the sport.

He spent the 1997 away from Reading, his home town club Newport Wasps look set to sign him but they changed their mind on a contract offer, so Morris joined Stoke Potters on loan from Reading, before re-joining his parent club for the 1998 season. In 1999 Morris proved himself as a force to be reckoned with in the Premier League and continued this form into the 2000 season, when he won the first speedway meeting of the year, at the New Year Classic on 2 January 2000 at Newport Speedway. The 2000 season was Morris' tenth on the books of Reading Speedway and he was granted a testimonial meeting, which attracted over 3000 people to Reading's Smallmead Stadium.

In 2001 and 2002 Morris continued to prove he was one of the best riders in the Premier League, and he came third in the 2002 Premier League Riders' Championship at Belle Vue. A knee injury suffered in Sweden curtailed his 2003 season, but he was back in the saddle for 2004, and proved his fitness with a 12-point maximum in his first meeting back against King's Lynn Stars. Although 2004 was to be his last full-time campaign in Reading colours, he also achieved one of his finest moments in the sport, when he partnered Danny Bird to win the Premier League Riders Pairs Championship.

Life after Reading
For the 2005 season Morris signed with the Newcastle Diamonds. Niggling injuries meant Morris did not quite live up to expectations.  In 2006, he was signed by Elite League Belle Vue, where his long-time friend and multi-world champion Jason Crump was team captain. Morris finished the season with a -point average.

For the 2007 season, he received the offer to ride for his home town club Newport, some ten years after they had pulled the plug on his contract. Although Morris was their highest scorer in most meetings, the team struggled badly and crowds dwindled, which led to the club cutting costs and Morris agreeing to move on and join fellow Premier League side Birmingham.

Birmingham Brummies
Morris was signed on a full transfer by the Birmingham Brummies in 2008.  Morris suffered serious internal injuries in a crash at Mildenhall in early April and on his return to action in late May he suffered another injury, a badly dislocated shoulder at Rye House.

Final years
His injury problems were to have a lasting effect on the Welshman, and, although he returned to the saddle in 2009, signing to ride for the Stoke Potters in the Premier League and starting the season well with some good performances, problems with his shoulder meant his scoring slumped and he was axed from the side, going on to ride for the Workington Comets, where again he struggled for points. He also doubled up with the Lakeside Hammers in the Elite League, where he produced a number of good performances. However, he took a heavy fall at Workington in August, and once again the shoulder was badly dislocated. On the advice of medics he took the decision to retire from speedway to avoid permanent damage to the shoulder. Morris announced his retirement from competitive Speedway at the age of 34 in September 2009. Two years later, in September 2011, Morris staged his farewell meeting at Birmingham Speedway.

Management
He was appointed as head coach of the 2010 Great Britain under 21 team. This proved so successful that he was tasked with responsibility for the management, development and co-ordination of activities with regards to the riders aged 21 and below in British Speedway a role he continued in for the next 4 seasons.
 
In 2012 he was appointed Assistant Team Manager for the Senior Squad as well, a role he undertook for 2013 Speedway World Cup as well.   
Morris also successfully lead Team GB to a series victory over Australia in a series of meetings held on Premier League tracks.

In 2012 Morris returned to the Birmingham Brummies to manage the team, alongside the incumbent manager and promoter Graham Drury. In their first year as joint team managers they led the Brummies to the Elite League play-off's, for the first time since the club's reformation in 2006. For the 2013 season Morris took over the full team management duties, where he led the Brummies to the league's top slot at the end of the season, only to see them lose to Poole Pirates in the grand final.   Morris resigned from his position at the end of the campaign, revealing unrest behind the scenes as his main reasons.

After playing a key role in the development of the newly formed Elite League Rider draft system, which saw young British riders fast tracked into the 2014 Elite League teams, Morris decided to tender his resignation from the role of under 21 coach at the end of the season. In December 2014, he was named the new FIM Race Director for the Speedway Grand Prix World Championship series as well as the Speedway World Cup, following the retirement of Tony Olsson.

Game show appearances
Morris has appeared on a number of UK television game shows including The Weakest Link, Brainbox Challenge where he won several hundred pounds and Eggheads.

References

1975 births
Living people
British speedway riders
Welsh motorcycle racers
Welsh speedway riders
Sportspeople from Newport, Wales
Belle Vue Aces riders
Reading Racers riders
Newport Wasps riders
Lakeside Hammers riders
Birmingham Brummies riders
Newcastle Diamonds riders
Stoke Potters riders